Kolodnoye is a rural locality in Polevskoy Selsoviet Rural Settlement, Kursky District, Kursk Oblast, Russia. Population:

Geography 
The village is located on the Seym River (a left tributary of the Desna), 98 km from the Russia–Ukraine border, 17 km south-east of the district center – the town Kursk, 5 km from the selsoviet center – Polevaya.

 Streets
There are the following streets in the locality: Mirnaya, Naberezhnaya, Tikhiye pereulochki and Tsentralnaya (344 houses).

 Climate
Kolodnoye has a warm-summer humid continental climate (Dfb in the Köppen climate classification).

Transport 
Kolodnoye is located 8 km from the federal route  (Kursk – Voronezh –  "Kaspy" Highway; a part of the European route ), on the road of regional importance  (Kursk – Bolshoye Shumakovo – Polevaya via Lebyazhye), in the vicinity of the railway halt Kolodnoye (railway line Klyukva — Belgorod).

The rural locality is situated 17.5 km from Kursk Vostochny Airport, 110 km from Belgorod International Airport and 193 km from Voronezh Peter the Great Airport.

References

Notes

Sources

Rural localities in Kursky District, Kursk Oblast